Auntie Boss! is a Kenyan comedy-drama television series. It delves into the lives of  domestic house helps in the fictional Taifa Estate (Loresho Ridge Estate) and their everyday drama as it revolves around families they work for and activities within the neighbourhood. It reflects the normal Kenyan culture about relationships the house helps have with their bosses. The story also features a lifestyle of the upper middle class in Kenyan society.

Production
The comedy featured an ensemble cast of Nyce Wanjeri, Sandra Dacha, Sospeetah Kiritu, Abdul Karim Athman, Eve D' Souza, Grace Muna and Maqbul Mohammed. Directed by Ofmwoko Aswani for the first two seasons before he died of cancer. Likarion Wainaina took over as the director of the series. The directors are Eve D'Souza who is also the one of the main cast members and Lucy Mwangi. Moonbeam production released the premiere of the series on YouTube 23 August 2014.

Cast
 Nyce Wanjeri as Shiru; she is quite illiterate. She is easily swayed by more intelligent people than her. At one time she is conned and all the Maingi family domestic properties are lost. Her boss is quite fond of her despite her gruesome nature making her less susceptible to being fired. Nyce confirmed that she was leaving the series following winning of an award at the Africa Magic Viewers' Choice Awards for best actress in a comedy TV show.
 Sospeetah Kiritu as  Amos; he is Varshita's loyal maid. Being the only male maid in Taifa Estate, Amos is obedient and knows all boundaries between an employer and his employee. 
 Sandra Dacha as Silprosa; she is a gourmand. She often faces criticism for her plus size. She works for Mayweather who has some tolerance to her antics
 Abdul Karim Athman as Cosmas; a mischievous watchman of Taifa Estate. He has his own side hustles. He is money-thirsty and will do any thing to get it. Abdul has not reprised his role for the current season
 Grace Muna as Vanessa, Shiru's boss and Kyle's mother. Despite Shiru's behaviour she tolerates her as she is good with Kyle. Shiru soon quits and sues Vanessa making her hire Njoroge as her new house keeper 
 Shadya Delgush as Malkia; Silprosa's former boss.
 Eve D'Souza as Varshita is the perfect example of an upper class boss. She is of Indian origins and girlfriend to Donavan. Varshita is extremely difficult to be with. She leads an extravagant lifestyle that only burdens her boyfriend Donavan. Varshita and Donovan soon move away. This serves as a reference to commitment to the show Varshita
 Maqbul Mohammed as Donavan, Varshita's boyfriend.
 David Opondoe as Victor Mayweather. An extravagant Luo man who is Silprosa's boss
 Mathew Mwangi as Kyle, Vanessa and Maingi's son.
 Gloria Owichira as Ndinda
 Joyce Maina as Jojo
 Arthur Macharia as Brian
 Nick Odhiambo as Teacher Japolo
 John Wagatua as Njeru
 Sifa Githinji as Sifa
 Allan Ngujiri as Babu
Johnson "Fish" Chege as Njoroge

Series overview

References

2010s Kenyan television series
2014 Kenyan television series debuts
Kenyan comedy television series
Swahili-language television shows
NTV (Kenyan TV channel) original programming